Kabakköy can refer to:

 Kabakköy, Çerkeş
 Kabakköy, Polatlı
 Kabakköy, Seben